The 100-bed capacity Our Lady of Lourdes Hospital is a tertiary hospital located in Daet, Camarines Norte, Philippines, servicing the entire Bicol Region.

The hospital is affiliated with the Our Lady of Lourdes College Foundation, and the Emilia Palencia Medical Mission.  It is named for Our Lady of Lourdes.

Emilia Palencia Medical Mission
The Emilia Palencia Medical-Dental Mission is an annual program organized by the Our Lady of Lourdes Hospital to provide free medical and dental care to the residents of Daet and the surrounding towns.  It is held during the month of May and is named in honor of the late wife of Dr. Abundio Palencia, Sr., the hospital's founder. The mission has been held annually since 1997 until the present, and has served over 25,000 people since that time. The mission is staffed with volunteers from the local sector, as well as dozens of medical and dental practitioners, nurses, dental assistants, and hygienists from the United States.  It is a non-profit organization.

References

Medical missions

Hospitals in the Philippines
Buildings and structures in Camarines Norte
Hospitals established in 1965